"First Day of My Life" is a song by British singer Melanie C. It was released on 30 September 2005 in Germany, Austria, and Switzerland as the third and final single from Melanie C's third solo album, Beautiful Intentions (2005). The song peaked at number one in Germany, Spain, and Switzerland, being certified platinum in Germany and gold in Switzerland. The song is Melanie C's most successful single in continental Europe, spending two years in different European charts. The single has sold over 1.5 million copies worldwide.

Background
The song was written by Guy Chambers and Enrique Iglesias and had originally been recorded by Italian tenor Andrea Bocelli, with lyrics in Italian as "Un Nuovo Giorno" (A new day) for his 2004 eponymous album Andrea, and he also released it as a single the same year. The song was not from the original Beautiful Intentions release, but was included on a re-release in Germany, Switzerland, Austria, and other European countries.

Chart performance
The song became one of the biggest hits in Europe in 2005, but it was never released in UK as a commercial single, though it was included as a B side on one of the two UK CDs of her single "Carolyna". The song also was nominated as "The Single of the Year" at the 2006 ECHO Awards in Germany but lost to "Hung Up" by Madonna. On 15 September 2006, "First Day of My Life" went platinum in Germany, selling over 400,000 copies.

After a huge success of this single in Europe, Melanie recorded this song in French (Je suis née pour toi — I Am Born For You), to promote the single and album for French market. "First Day of My Life" also appeared on Chisholm's fourth album This Time as a bonus track for the Italian release.

The song spent 57 weeks on the Swiss Singles Chart, entering on 16 October 2005 at number 15 and exiting the charts on 13 May 2007 at number 87. It peaked at number one for two weeks, from 13 to 20 November 2005.

Music video
The video was shot on location in Hannover, Lower Saxony, Germany, on 26 August 2005 and features a number of recognizable local landmarks. For key scenes of the video, a busy downtown thoroughfare known to locals as the Raschplatzhochstraße or Raschplatz overpass (on which Melanie can be seen standing and singing in the video) was closed for the afternoon.

Formats and track listings

 European 3-Track CD
 "First Day of My Life" – 4:04
 "First Day of My Life"  – 4:04
 "Runaway" - 3:24

 German 2-Track CD
 "First Day of My Life" – 4:04
 "Runaway" – 3:24

 German Maxi CD
 "First Day of My Life" – 4:04
 "First Day of My Life"  – 4:04
 "Runaway" – 3:24
 "First Day of My Life"  – 4:04

 Australian Maxi CD
 "First Day of My Life" – 4:04
 "First Day of My Life"  - 4:04
 "Better Alone"  – 6:50
 "Better Alone"  – 3:05
 "Better Alone"  – 3:56

 France CD
 "First Day of My Life" – 4:04
 "First Day of My Life"  – 4:04

 Italian CD
 "First Day of My Life" – 4:04
 "First Day of My Life"  – 4:04
 "Warrior" – 3:47
 "First Day of My Life"  – 4:04

Charts

Weekly charts

Year-end charts

Decade-end charts

Certifications

Release history

References

Andrea Bocelli songs
2004 singles
2004 songs
2005 singles
Melanie C songs
Number-one singles in Germany
Number-one singles in Spain
Number-one singles in Switzerland
Songs written by Guy Chambers
Songs written by Enrique Iglesias

bg:First Day of My Life (песен на Мелани Си)
it:First Day of My Life
pt:First Day Of My Life